S. Puratchimani was elected to the Tamil Nadu Legislative Assembly from the Mangalore constituency in the 1996 elections. The constituency was reserved for candidates from the Scheduled Castes. He was a candidate of the Tamil Maanila Congress (TMC) party.

References 

Tamil Nadu MLAs 1996–2001
Tamil Maanila Congress politicians
Possibly living people
Year of birth missing
Tamil Nadu MLAs 1991–1996